Ranipauwa (Nepali: रानीपौवा)  is the name of Ward Number 11 in Pokhara Metropolitan City in Nepal. It is a residential area.

Boundaries of Ranipauwa 

 East: Matepani
 West: Mahendrapul
 North: Phulbari
 South: Hospital Chowk

References 

Geography of Pokhara